Neha Aggarwal Sharma (born 11 January 1990) is an Indian table tennis player who participated in the 2008 Summer Olympics in Beijing, the only woman from India to feature in that discipline. Aggarwal earned her position at the Olympics by defeating Poulomi Ghatak and Mouma Das, who had been favored to win. The Delhi girl, who did her schooling from Delhi Public School, R. K. Puram and her college from St. Stephen's College, Delhi, was the winner of Junior National Table Tennis Championship held at Ahmedabad and Kolkata. She did not receive a medal, having been eliminated after losing to Chinese born Australian Jiang Fang Lay. She has a Masters in Sports Management from Columbia University, New York.

See also
Indian Squad for 2008 Olympics

References

External links 
Delhi Public School
TV Asia's special feature on Indian Olympic athlete Neha Aggarwal - Columbia University - NYC on YouTube
Table tennis at the 2008 Beijing Summer Games

Living people
Indian female table tennis players
Olympic table tennis players of India
Sportswomen from Delhi
Delhi Public School alumni
1990 births
Table tennis players at the 2014 Asian Games
21st-century Indian women
21st-century Indian people
Asian Games competitors for India
Table tennis players at the 2008 Summer Olympics